The 1984 USFL season was the second season of the United States Football League.

Rule changes
 The USFL added the side judge to the game officials, making a seven-man crew.
 Teams played preseason games in 1984. There had been no preseason games in 1983.

Franchise changes
Boston Breakers are sold and relocate to New Orleans, Louisiana as the New Orleans Breakers on October 18, 1983.
Six expansion teams: Houston Gamblers, Jacksonville Bulls, Memphis Showboats, Oklahoma Outlaws, Pittsburgh Maulers and San Antonio Gunslingers
Chicago Blitz's owner buys Arizona Wranglers and sells Blitz, all but two Blitz players are traded to Arizona, all but two Wranglers players are traded to Chicago. The Blitz coaches also go to Arizona, with Chicago acquiring a new coaching staff in 1984. The franchises also trade draft choices.

General news
On September 21, 1983, the New Jersey Generals were sold to real estate tycoon and future President of the United States Donald Trump.

On October 19, 1983, the United States Football League awarded the 1984 USFL Champion Game to Tampa Stadium in Tampa, FL and the 1985 USFL Championship Game to the Pontiac Silverdome in Pontiac, MI.

On February 15, the USFL took control of the Chicago Blitz.

The Denver Gold were sold during the 1984 season.

In May 1984, the USFL announced a "new" Chicago franchise would be created for the 1985 season.

Players vote to form a union, United States Football League Players Association, with former Buffalo Bills linebacker Doug Allen serving as executive director.

Philadelphia and Tampa Bay played in a post season exhibition game billed as "The Jetsave Challenge Cup" in Wembley Stadium on July 21. Philadelphia won 24–21.

On August 22, 1984, the owners voted to move to a fall schedule starting in 1986.

On October 19, 1984, the owners reaffirmed the move to the fall.

Regular season
W = Wins, L = Losses, T = Ties, PCT= Winning Percentage, PF= Points For, PA = Points Against

 = Division Champion,  = Wild Card

Birmingham won the Southern Division championship over Tampa Bay based on a division record tiebreaker advantage (7-1-0 to 6-2-0).  Birmingham and Tampa Bay tied in the first tiebreaking step, head-to-head (1-1-0).

Tampa Bay won the tiebreaker over New Jersey for the 3rd seed based on winning the head-to-head game.

Los Angeles won the Pacific Division championship over Arizona based on a conference record tiebreaker advantage (7-4-0 to 5-6-0).  Los Angeles and Arizona tied in the first two tiebreaking steps, head-to-head (1-1-0) and best divisional record (3-3-0).

Michigan won the tiebreaker over Arizona for the 3rd seed based on winning the head-to-head game.

Pittsburgh finished ahead of Washington based on a head-to-head tiebreaker advantage (2-0-0).

Playoffs
Home team in CAPITALS

Divisional Playoffs June 30 – July 1
 PHILADELPHIA 28, New Jersey 7
 LOS ANGELES 27, Michigan 21 (3 OT)
 BIRMINGHAM 36, Tampa Bay 17
 Arizona 17, HOUSTON 16

Conference Championships July 7–8
 ARIZONA 35, Los Angeles 23
 PHILADELPHIA 20, Birmingham 10

USFL Championship Game 

July 15 (at Tampa, Florida)
 PHILADELPHIA 23, Arizona 3

Statistics

1984 regular season stat leaders

1984 USFL regular season sortable offensive team statistics

1984 USFL regular season sortable defensive team statistics

Awards

1984 USFL All-League Team
 WR Trumaine Johnson, AZ
 WR Richard Johnson, HOU
 TE Dan Ross, NO
 T Irv Eatman, PHIL
 T Pat Phenix, BIRM
 G Buddy Aydelette, BIRM
 G Chuck Commiskey, PHIL
 C Bart Oates, PHIL
 QB Jim Kelly, HOU
 HB Joe Cribbs, BIRM
 HB Kelvin Bryant, PHIL
 DE Pete Catan, HOU
 DE John Lee, AZ
 DT Kit Lathrop, AZ
 NT Pete Kugler, PHIL
 LB Kiki DeAyala, HOU
 LB Jim LeClair, NJ
 LB Sam Mills, PHIL
 LB Ed Smith, AZ
 CB Peter Raeford, SA
 CB Garcia Lane, PHIL
 S Marcus Quinn, OAKL
 S Mike Lush, PHIL
 K Toni Fritsch, HOU
 KR Derrick Crawford, MEM
 P Stan Talley, OAKL
 PR David Martin, DENV
 MVP —QB Jim Kelly, HOU
 Coach of the year – Jim Mora, PHIL
 Defensive Player of the year —S Marcus Quinn, OAKL

1984 The Sporting News USFL All-Star Team
 WR Trumaine Johnson, AZ
 WR Joey Walters, WASH
 TE Dan Ross, NO
 T Irv Eatman, PHIL
 T Gary Zimmerman, LA
 G Buddy Aydelette, BIRM
 G Gerry Raymond, OAKL
 C Wayne Radloff, MICH
 QB Chuck Fusina, PHIL
 HB Joe Cribbs, BIRM
 HB Kelvin Bryant, PHIL
 DE Pete Catan, HOU
 DE Karl Lorch, AZ
 DT Kit Lathrop, AZ
 LB James Harrell, TB
 LB Jim LeClair, NJ
 LB John Corker, MICH
 LB Howard Carson, LA
 CB Jerry Holmes, PITT
 CB David Martin, DENV
 S Marcus Quinn, OAKL
 S Gary Barbaro, NJ
 K Tony Zendejas, LA
 KR Derrick Crawford, MEM
 P Sean Landeta, PHIL
 PR David Martin, DENV
 Rookie of the year — QB Jim Kelly, HOU
 Player of the year—QB Chuck Fusina, PHIL
 Coach of the year -- Jim Mora, PHIL
 Executive of the year -- Carl Peterson, PHIL

See also
 1984 NFL season

References

United States Football League
1984